Heptacodium miconioides, the seven-son flower, is a species of flowering plant. It is the sole species in the monotypic genus Heptacodium, of the honeysuckle family Caprifoliaceae. The common name "seven-son flower" is a direct translation of the Standard Chinese name 七子花 qī zi huā.

Endemic to China, this species was discovered for Western horticulture in 1907 by the British plant hunter Ernest Wilson on behalf of the Arnold Arboretum. It was growing on mountain cliffs at 'Hsing-Shan Hsien' in present-day Xingshan County in the west of Hubei Province in central China. Considered rare even at that time, only nine populations are known to remain in the wild (e.g. one on Tiantai Mountain), all of them in Anhui and Zhejiang provinces and threatened by habitat loss. The species is now under second-class national protection in China. The Sino-American Botanical Expedition of 1980 collected viable seeds and sent them to the Arnold Arboretum where it was found to be readily cultivated. The plant is now grown as an ornamental around the 
world.

Description
The bark of the trunk is papery and thin, light tan in colour, and exfoliates in strips or sheets. The upright, spreading, quadrangular branches give the plant a rounded, often irregular shape. The dark-green cordate leaves are opposite, 8–10 cm long by 5–6 cm wide, with entire margins and deeply impressed venation running parallel to the margin.
In September, H. miconioides  produces large shows of small fragrant white blooms attractive to butterflies and bumblebees, the flowers five-petalled, < 13 mm across.  When the white corollas have fallen, the calyces develop into deep red expanded lobes which persist into November. The plant may be found in scrub, woodlands, and on the margins of broadleaved evergreen forests, often on cliffs, at altitudes of 600–1000 metres.

Six flowers, not seven
Noted plantsman John Grimshaw, director of the Yorkshire Arboretum, relayed the following observation of H. miconioides from distinguished botanist Allen J. Coombes, (formerly of the Hillier Gardens and currently coordinator of scientific collections at the University Botanic Garden Puebla, Mexico):'Seven' is actually misleading, for the flowers in each capitulum are held in two rows of three clustered around a central bud, which is not a flower bud but in fact a continuation of the inflorescence axis, which will push up as the flowers fade and develop a new ring of six flowers, again around a central bud. Three such iterations have been observed.

Cultivation
Readily propagated from either seed or by softwood cuttings, the species has since become widely available in North America and Europe, and was stocked by 26 nurseries in the UK alone in 2011. All six of the first H. miconioides planted in the United States in 1980 at the Arnold Arboretum are still alive, indicating an expected lifespan greater than 40 years. This plant has gained the Royal Horticultural Society’s Award of Garden Merit.

Notable trees
In the UK, a specimen 8 m high (2012) planted in 1981 grows in the Flagpole Bed alongside Jermyn House at the Sir Harold Hillier Gardens, Ampfield, near Romsey.

Etymology
The generic name of Heptacodium has sometimes erroneously been said to mean 'seven bells' with a second element derived from Greek κώδων (codon) - 'bell', but was in fact coined by Arnold Arboretum taxonomist Alfred Rehder from the Greek κώδειά (codeia) - 'poppy head' with the prefix έπτά (hepta-) 'seven', giving the meaning 'having seven structures resembling poppy heads'. The specific epithet miconioides alludes to the similarities in the plant, particularly its boldly-veined leaves, to certain species belonging to the unrelated genus Miconia (family Melastomataceae).

The common name in Standard Chinese 七子花 (qī zi huā) is composed of the characters 七 (qī) 'seven', 子 (zi) 'son' / 'child'  and 花 (huā) 'flower' - whence 'Seven Son(s) Flower' ('Flower with seven children'). Approximate pronunciation (not allowing for tonality of Chinese language) 'Chee-dzu-hwaa'.

Medicinal potential
Recent tests have demonstrated that extracts from the plant possess antibacterial activity.
The leaf blades of Heptacodium have been found to contain flavonoids, tannins, alkaloids, saponins, lignin and chlorogenic acid.

Gallery

References

 Airy Shaw, H. K. (1952). A second species of the genus Heptacodium Rehd.(Caprifoliaceae). Kew Bulletin 1952, Number 2, pages 245–246.

 
Endemic flora of China
Vulnerable plants
Flora of Zhejiang
Flora of Yunnan
Monotypic asterid genera
Caprifoliaceae genera
Taxonomy articles created by Polbot